Gibbula denizi is a species of sea snail, a marine gastropod mollusk in the family Trochidae, the top snails.

Description
The height of the shell attains 3 mm.

Distribution
This species occurs in the Atlantic Ocean off Angola.

References

 Rolán E. & Swinnen F. (2013) A new species of Gibbula (Prosobranchia, Trochidae) from Angola. Gloria Maris 52(5): 123–127

Endemic fauna of Angola
denizi
Gastropods described in 2013